CUMYL-CBMICA (SGT-280) is an indole-3-carboxamide based synthetic cannabinoid receptor agonist which has been sold as a designer drug, first being identified in Germany in August 2019. Since the structure fell outside the German drug analogue law provisions at the time, an amendment was made to the law to expand the relevant definition, which came into effect in April 2020. It has been shown to act as a CB1 receptor agonist with an EC50 of 62.9nM.

See also 
 CUMYL-CBMINACA
 CUMYL-THPINACA

References 

Cannabinoids
Designer drugs
Carboxamides
Indoles